Kalnaberžė ('the hill of birch trees', formerly) is a village in Kėdainiai district municipality, in Kaunas County, in central Lithuania. According to the 2011 census, the village had a population of 324 people. It is located between Surviliškis (6 km) and Sirutiškis (5 km), on the right bank of the Nevėžis river. At the confluence of Nevėžis and its tributary Kruostas II there is Kalnaberžė hillfort. There is library, old cemetery, former school and medicine station in the village. Kalnaberžė manor (now in ruins) is famous of being a childhood vacation place for Russian minister Pyotr Stolypin.

The town has a relatively low population density and is surrounded by forests and farmland. Its economy is primarily based on agriculture and forestry.

History
Kalnaberžė (as Calleberze) was mentioned the first time in 1371 by Hermann von Wartberge as Teutonic ride devastated this place. Kalnaberžė manor is known from the 16th century as a famous Dance hall as well as holding area for parties. It belonged to the Radziwiłł family, later to the Czapski family. After the January Uprising it was transferred to the Koshelevski and later to the Stolypin family. At the end of the 19th century there was a wooden chapel.

During the Interwar period, the manor was nationalized and became a child detention colony, and since 1949 till 1959 was a children home. During the Soviet era, Kalnaberžė was a kolkhoz center.

Economy
The economy of Kalnaberžė is predominantly based on agriculture and forestry. The town is surrounded by dense forests and fertile farmland, which provides a source of income for many of its residents. In addition to agriculture and forestry, there are also a few small businesses and service providers in the town, such as shops, restaurants, and a post office.

Demographics 
As of 2011, the population of Kalnaberžė was 324 people, with a slight majority of females (52%). The town has a relatively low population density of around 100 people per square kilometer.

The ethnic makeup of Kalnaberžė is predominantly Lithuanian, with around 97% of the population identifying as Lithuanian. The remaining 3% of the population consists of small minorities of Russians and Ukrainians. The official language of Kalnaberžė is Lithuanian, which is spoken by the majority of the population. However, there are also some residents who speak Russian and Latvian due to their proximity to the neighboring countries.

In terms of age distribution, the population of Kalnaberžė is relatively evenly spread across different age groups. The largest age group is those between the ages of 30 and 59, who make up approximately 44% of the population. The second-largest age group is those aged 60 and above, who make up around 28% of the population. The remaining 28% of the population is made up of children and young adults under the age of 30.

The majority of the population of Kalnaberžė is Christian, with the Roman Catholic Church being the most prevalent denomination. The town has a single Catholic church, which serves the local community. In addition to the Catholic Church, there are also a few Protestant churches in the surrounding area.

Demographic history

Notable people
Juozas Vidmantis Vaitkus, Lithuanian physicist

Images

References

Villages in Kaunas County
Kėdainiai District Municipality